Lorenzo Taezaz (30 June 1900 – 23 June 1947) was an important diplomatic official for Ethiopia. He served as Emperor Haile Selassie's diplomatic representative during the Emperor's exile in Britain following the Second Italo-Ethiopian War, being the permanent delegate from Ethiopia to the League of Nations. After the restoration of the Ethiopian government, Lorenzo was Minister of Foreign Affairs, Minister of Posts and Telegraph, and served in the Ethiopian Senate.

Life 
Lorenzo Taezaz was born in the Akele Guzaie province of Eritrea, then an Italian colony. One source believes he received his earliest education in Italian schools in Asmara and Keren, although Bahru Zewde believes he studied at the Swedish mission school in Asmara. Following a chance meeting with Ras Taferi Makonnen (the later Emperor Haile Selassie), he received a scholarship to study in France, and spent eight years at the University of Montpellier, where he received his doctorate in Law. On returning to Ethiopia, he became the second Consul General of Ethiopia to Eritrea after Lij Seifu Mikael was recalled to takeover Hakim Workneh Eshete's job as governor of the lucrative Chercher region upon Hakim Workneh's departure to London representing Ethiopia, he then served in the Ministry of Justice, and was a member of the Anglo-Ethiopian Boundary Commission which demarcated Ethiopia's borders with former British Somaliland, and that later investigated the causes of the Walwal Incident of 1934. Lorenzo is said to have seen action at the Battle of Maychew in 1936. He literally followed Emperor Haile Selassie's departure from Ethiopia, riding on the next train to Djibouti, along with three Swedish officers, most of the ministers and other notables of the Imperial court. 

After Haile Selassie addressed the League of Nations, and after Lorenzo was appointed Permanent Delegate to that body, although during the Italian occupation, he secretly entered Ethiopia on several occasions for the Emperor. One such occasion was in November 1940, when he accompanied three elders who were returning to Armachiho in northern Ethiopia after waiting in Khartoum for help from the British; another was not long after this, he travelled to Kenya where he aided in organizing Ethiopian soldiers who had been interned there for years, having fled there not long after the Italian conquest in 1937.

After Haile Selassie's return to Ethiopia, Lorenzo was appointed Minister for Foreign Affairs (1941–1943), and subsequently Minister for Posts, Telephones and Telegrams (1943). According to Bahru Zewde, Lorenzo came into conflict with the powerful Tsehafi Taezaz ("Minister of the Pen") Wolde Giyorgis Wolde Yohannes, who had him appointed to the ceremonial President of the Chamber of Deputies (1943–1944), then ambassador to the Soviet Union (November 1944) -- effectively exiled from the center of power, then a delegate to the Paris Peace Conference (May 1946); after being in Sweden for only a month, he died in a hospital in Stockholm.

References

1900 births
1947 deaths
Foreign ministers of Ethiopia
Ethiopian diplomats
University of Montpellier alumni
20th-century diplomats